Claudio Acosta (born 12 February 1988) is an Argentine football striker. He currently plays for Cañuelas in Argentina.

Acosta was part of the San Lorenzo squad that won the Clausura 2007 tournament.

Titles

External links
 Argentine Primera statistics
 Claudio Acosta at BDFA

1988 births
Living people
Argentine footballers
Argentine expatriate footballers
Sportspeople from Salta Province
Association football forwards
Argentine Primera División players
San Lorenzo de Almagro footballers
Juventud Antoniana footballers
Club Almagro players
Club Atlético Colegiales (Argentina) players
Gimnasia y Tiro footballers
Sportivo Patria footballers
Sportivo Desamparados footballers
Comisión de Actividades Infantiles footballers
Cañuelas footballers
Argentine expatriate sportspeople in Thailand
Expatriate footballers in Thailand